Vallet is a surname. It may refer to:

 Auguste Vallet de Viriville, (1815–1868), French archivist and historian
 Bernard Vallet (born 1954), French road bicycle racer
 Cédric Vallet (born 1971), French cross-country skier
 Edouard Vallet (1876–1929), Swiss artist.
 Francisco de Paula Vallet (1883–1947), Spanish Jesuit priest
 Frédérique Vallet-Bisson (1862–1949), French painter
 María Vallet-Regí (born 1946), Spanish inorganic chemist.
 Nicolas Vallet (c. 1583 – c. 1642), French lutenist and composer
 Pierre Vallet (c1575–1657), French botanical artist, engraver and embroidery designer